Jacques Mairesse may refer to:
 Jacques Mairesse (footballer)
 Jacques Mairesse (economist)